Augusto Farfus Jr. (born 3 September 1983) is a Brazilian professional racing driver, and BMW Motorsport works driver. He lives in Monaco.

Early years 
Born in Curitiba, Farfus first tasted racing in minibike races and won the local championships in 1991.

Like many drivers, his motorsport career began with karting. In 1992, at the age of 9 years, he won the Paraná state championship (cadet class), and mainly competed in São Paulo states championship from 1993 to 1998. In 1999 he succeeded in both winning the Italian Winter Cup and finishing runner-up in the North American Championship. He is married to Elirane Johnsson.

Formula racing 
In 2000 Farfus moved to Italy and competed in the Formula Renault Italian championship and the Eurocup series for the next two years, winning the Eurocup in 2001.

For 2002 he joined Draco Racing in Euro Formula 3000. In 2003 he won the Euro Formula 3000 Championship aged just 20 years old.

Touring cars

Alfa Romeo 
From 2004 to 2006 Farfus was a factory Alfa Romeo (N.Technology) driver in the European Touring Car Championship and later, the World Touring Car Championship.

In the 2006 season Farfus fought for the title against Andy Priaulx and Jörg Müller until the final race in Macau, but his outdated Alfa Romeo 156 wasn't up to the pace, and Farfus ended the season in 3rd place.

BMW 

Before the 2007 season, he switched to the Schnitzer BMW-run squad, BMW Team Germany, alongside the German, 2006 season runner-up, Jörg Müller. He temporarily led the championship during the season, but ended this season in 4th place as Priaulx won. He has continued with the team through the 2008 season and into 2009. He scored six wins in 2009, missing out on the title to SEAT's Gabriele Tarquini at the final meeting In 2010, BMW's participation in the WTCC was limited to a two-car line-up, as Farfus joined Andy Priaulx at the Racing Bart Mampaey team. Farfus scored no wins, however he won race 2 at Okayama on the road, but he and teammate Priaulx were disqualified by running a non-homologated gearbox that did not conform to the technical regulations. On 5 December 2010, BMW announced it was withdrawing from the WTCC, but would continue to supply customer teams with its 320TC car.

On 25 January 2011, it was announced that Farfus would contest the Intercontinental Le Mans Cup with BMW, which would also include its former WTCC drivers Andy Priaulx, Jörg Müller and Dirk Muller.

Hyundai
On 3 December 2018, it was announced that Farfus will join Hyundai for the 2019 World Touring Car Cup season, partnering the series's inaugural driver's champion, Gabriele Tarquini , Norbert Michelisz and Nicky Catsburg.

Racing record

Career summary

† As Farfus was a guest driver, he was ineligible to score points.
* Season still in progress.

Complete Euro Formula 3000 results
(key) (Races in bold indicate pole position; races in italics indicate fastest lap)

24 Hours of Daytona results

Complete European Touring Car Championship results
(key) (Races in bold indicate pole position) (Races in italics indicate fastest lap)

Complete World Touring Car Championship results
(key) (Races in bold indicate pole position) (Races in italics indicate fastest lap)

Complete 24 Hours of Le Mans results

Complete Deutsche Tourenwagen Masters results
(key) (Races in bold indicate pole position) (Races in italics indicate fastest lap)

† Driver retired, but was classified as they completed 75% of the winner's race distance.

Complete IMSA SportsCar Championship results
(key) (Races in bold indicate pole position) (Races in italics indicate fastest lap)

† Farfus did not complete sufficient laps in order to score full points.
* Season still in progress.

Complete Super GT results
(key) (Races in bold indicate pole position) (Races in italics indicate fastest lap)

Complete FIA World Endurance Championship results
(key) (Races in bold indicate pole position; races in italics indicate fastest lap)

Complete World Touring Car Cup results
(key) (Races in bold indicate pole position) (Races in italics indicate fastest lap)

Complete European Le Mans Series results
(key) (Races in bold indicate pole position; results in italics indicate fastest lap)

† As Farfus was a guest driver, he was ineligible for points.

References

External links 

 
 
 Augusto Farfus Jr. em foco (Funo!) 

1983 births
Living people
Sportspeople from Curitiba
Brazilian expatriates in Monaco
Brazilian racing drivers
Brazilian World Touring Car Championship drivers
Brazilian World Touring Car Cup drivers
24 Hours of Le Mans drivers
Auto GP drivers
Italian Formula Renault 2.0 drivers
Formula Renault Eurocup drivers
American Le Mans Series drivers
European Le Mans Series drivers
Supercars Championship drivers
Brazilian Deutsche Tourenwagen Masters drivers
European Touring Car Championship drivers
24 Hours of Daytona drivers
Stock Car Brasil drivers
Super GT drivers
Blancpain Endurance Series drivers
24 Hours of Spa drivers
International GT Open drivers
FIA World Endurance Championship drivers
Nürburgring 24 Hours drivers
BMW M drivers
Cram Competition drivers
RC Motorsport drivers
Draco Racing drivers
Garry Rogers Motorsport drivers
Rahal Letterman Lanigan Racing drivers
Racing Bart Mampaey drivers
Teo Martín Motorsport drivers
Schnitzer Motorsport drivers
Aston Martin Racing drivers
Rowe Racing drivers
Brazilian WeatherTech SportsCar Championship drivers
Hyundai Motorsport drivers
24H Series drivers
W Racing Team drivers